Nahrunda is a rural locality in the Gympie Region, Queensland, Australia.

Geography
Eel Creek, a tributary of the Mary River, forms the south-eastern and eastern boundaries.

References 

Gympie Region
Localities in Queensland